Poland competed at the 1983 World Championships in Athletics in Helsinki, Finland, from 7–14 August 1983.

Medalists

Full results

Men
Track and road events

Field events

Combined events – Decathlon

Women
Track and road events

References

External links 
 1st IAAF World Championships in Athletics Helsinki 07/14-Aug-83 at iaaf.org

World Championships in Athletics
Nations at the 1983 World Championships in Athletics
Poland at the World Championships in Athletics